The Divorce is a 1970 Italian comedy film directed by Romolo Guerrieri.

Cast 

 Vittorio Gassman: Leonardo Nenci
 Anna Moffo: Elena, Leonardo's wife
 Nino Castelnuovo: Piero 
 Anita Ekberg: Flavia 
 Riccardo Garrone: Umberto 
 Claudie Lange: Sandra, Umberto's wife 
 Alessandro Momo: Fabrizio, Leonardo's son
 Francesco Mulé: Friar Leone 
 Helena Ronée: Daniela Gherardi
 Massimo Serato: Mario, Daniela's father
 Clara Colosimo: Isolina / Mafalda 
 Nadia Cassini: Carolina  
 Lars Bloch: Alex Bjørnson 
 Renzo Marignano: Marco 
 Umberto D'Orsi:  Doctor 
 Tiberio Murgia: Man at phone
 Mario Brega:  News-vendor

References

External links

1970 films
Italian comedy films
1970 comedy films
Films directed by Romolo Guerrieri
Films about divorce
Films scored by Fred Bongusto
1970s Italian-language films
1970s Italian films